Tampere Ice Stadium (often called Hakametsä) is an indoor sports arena in Tampere, Finland. It is primarily used for ice hockey, and it was the former home arena of Ilves and Tappara of the Finnish Liiga, until after the matches both teams played in November 2021, they moved to play the following matches in the new Nokia Arena. Today, the Ice Stadium is currently in use by the Koovee team.

The ice hall, designed by the architect Jaakko Tähtinen was built for the 1965 World Ice Hockey Championships and opened the same year. The current capacity of the ice hall for hockey games is 7,300 spectators (5,629 seats, 1,359 standing, 312 suites). Tampere ice stadium is the third biggest ice hall in the Finnish ice hockey league.

As there are several ice hockey venues in Tampere, this primary one is usually called "Hakametsän jäähalli" (after the district where it is located) or, more precisely, "Hakametsä 1" to distinguish it from the two smaller halls nearby.

History

Tampere Ice Stadium is the first and the oldest ice hockey arena in the country.

Finland was awarded the opportunity to host the 1965 ice hockey World Championships, and Helsinki was to build an arena for the tournament. However, Helsinki did not manage to finish the project in time, and Tampere was asked to build an arena and host the games instead.

The first game in the arena was an all-star game between Tampere and the rest of Finland, played on January 29, 1965. The score was tied at 4–4. The first league game was played by the local teams Ilves and Tappara on January 31, with Ilves taking a 5–3 win.

Originally, the spectator capacity of the Tampereen jäähalli was 10,200 people, with only 1,573 seats on the eastern side of the rink.

The ice hall has also served as one of the venues of the IIHF World Championship in  1982, 1991, 1997 and 2003 and also for the IIHF Women's World Championship in 1992.

Besides ice hockey, the venue has been used to host several other sports events, including the European and World Championships of boxing, wrestling, judo, and karate, and international matches of volleyball. Over the years there have also been several concerts by both domestic and international artists in the hall.

Features
The stands in the arena are of a rather rectangular shape, and are composed of a single level main stand and an overhanging balcony on the western side. On the eastern side there are 20 suites as well as facilities for the media. The standing places are located in the corners of the stands. Currently, the majority of the seats are padded, with some unpadded plastic seats remaining on the balcony.

In 2007, a new video screen cube was installed in the arena. Of note is the fact that the balcony hanging over the stand B blocks the view to the screen from the uppermost rows. This has been augmented by placing TV monitors under the balcony, mirroring the output of the screen.

There are several bars, restaurants and fast food stalls around the ice hall, as well as fan shops and the VIP clubs of the two local hockey teams.

Future
In the late 1990s and the early 2000s there were plans to build a new multi-purpose arena in Tampere, following the example of the Hartwall Areena built in Helsinki in 1997. However, these plans did not come to fruition, and the Hakametsä arena continued to serve as the primary hockey venue in the city. In May 2010, the Tampere City Council approved plans for the Tampereen monitoimiareena, which opened 3 December 2021. After 56 years at the venue, both Ilves and Tappara moved into the new Nokia Arena for the 2021-22 Liiga season.

A new exercise and sports area Hakametsä Sport Campus is growing around the Ice Stadium. In the winning concept of Peab and YH Kodit, Hakametsä will have apartments, new sports facilities and business and office facilities for sports companies, services or training. The old Ice Stadium will be renovated and, in addition to ice use, facilities will be created for other sports.

Retired jerseys

Tappara
 2: Kalevi Numminen
 3: Pekka Marjamäki
 7: Timo Jutila
 8: Janne Ojanen
 10: Timo Susi

Ilves 
 2: Jarmo Wasama
 7: Aarne Honkavaara
 13: Risto Jalo
 14: Lasse Oksanen
 16: Jorma Peltonen
 30: Jukka Tammi
 41: Raimo Helminen

Koovee 
 10: Heino Pulli

See also
 2021 Men's European Volleyball Championship
 Hakametsä (district)
 Nokia Arena, Tampere

References

External links
 
 City of Tampere – Tampere Ice Stadium

Indoor arenas in Finland
Indoor ice hockey venues in Finland
Buildings and structures in Tampere
Sports venues completed in 1965
1965 establishments in Finland